Ringuelet is a town located in the La Plata Partido of Buenos Aires Province of Argentina.

References

Populated places in Buenos Aires Province
La Plata Partido